Tunisia News is an English language weekly newspaper in Tunisia. It was founded by former Tunisian Minister of Agriculture, Environment and Water Resources Mohamed Lahbib Haddad.

See also
List of newspapers in Tunisia

References

External links
 Official site

English-language newspapers published in Arab countries
Weekly newspapers
Non-Arabic-language newspapers published in Tunisia